Earl C. "Billy" Hayes (November 21, 1884 – December 16, 1943) was an American football, basketball, and track and field coach. Hayes served as the head football coach at Mississippi A&M (now known as Mississippi State University) from the 1914 to 1916 seasons. During his three-season tenure, he compiled an overall record of 15 wins, 8 losses and 2 ties (15–8–2). At A&M he also served as the head basketball coach from 1912 to 1924 and compiled an overall record of 124 wins and 54 losses (124–54).  From 1924 to 1943, he coached track and field at Indiana University Bloomington. Hayes was also the head football coach at Indiana from 1931 to 1933, compiling a record of 6–14–4. He died of pneumonia at age 59 on December 16, 1943 in Bloomington, Indiana.

Head coaching record

Football

Basketball

References

External links
 

1884 births
1943 deaths
Albion College alumni
Basketball coaches from Indiana
Indiana Hoosiers football coaches
Mississippi State Bulldogs men's basketball coaches
Mississippi State Bulldogs football coaches
Indiana Hoosiers track and field coaches
People from Jefferson County, Indiana
Deaths from pneumonia in Indiana